Marc Beswick (born January 23, 1983) is a former professional Canadian football cornerback. He was drafted by the Winnipeg Blue Bombers in the 2008 CFL Draft with the 31st pick in the fourth round. He played CIS Football at Saint Mary's.

External links
Hamilton Tiger-Cats bio 
Winnipeg Blue Bombers bio

1983 births
Living people
Canadian football people from Vancouver
Canadian football defensive backs
Butte Roadrunners football players
Saint Mary's Huskies football players
Hamilton Tiger-Cats players
Winnipeg Blue Bombers players
Players of Canadian football from British Columbia